Dweller on the Threshold is the fourth full-length album by San Fernando Valley, California-based Latin Rock band Tribe of Gypsies.  It was written and recorded off and on between late 2000 and early 2006 with different personnel. The first sessions took place mere weeks after getting off the road in the U.S. with Santana; the last song to be completed was 'Stop Bombing Each Other!' in early spring of '06.

It marks the debut of new lead vocalist Chas West (ex-Jason Bonham Band) and guitarist Christian Byrne who contributed bass on the album in addition to regular four-stringer, Juan Perez.  Roy Z makes his lead vocal debut on La Hora and the Japanese bonus track, En El Mar, both sung in Spanish.

The album contains a cover of Ain't Talkin' 'Bout Love, originally released on the eponymous 1978 debut album by Van Halen.

Track listing
Big Sky Presence
Ride On
Desolate Chile
Stop Bombing Each Other!
Halos
Zoot Suit Mardi Gras
Go Your Way
After the Summer
Flying Tigers, Crying Dragons
Ain't Talkin' 'Bout Love
Never Will Be Mine
La Hora
Hands to Eternity
En El Mar (bonus track)

Notes
Musicians
Roy Z : guitars, vocals 
Chas West : vocals
Ray Rodriguez : keyboards
Elvis Balladares : percussion
David Moreno : drums 
Christian Byrne - guitar, bass
Juan Perez : bass

Guest Musicians
Gregg Analla : additional vocals & acoustic guitar on Go Your Way
David Ingraham : drums on Desolate Chile, Zoot Suit Mardi Gras & Go Your Way
Penny Wanzo : additional vocals on Stop Bombing Each Other! & Halos
Tetsuya ‘Tex’ Nakamura : harmonica on Zoot Suit Mardi Gras
Nicol Mecerova : vocals on Zoot Suit Mardi Gras
Sal Rodriguez : timbales on Ain't Talkin’ ‘Bout Love
Mistheria : additional keyboards & orchestration on Stop Bombing Each Other!
Richard Podolor : mandolin on Halos; additional guitar on Desolate Chile & La Hora

Production Credits
Produced by Richard Podolor & Roy Z
Co-produced by Bill Cooper and Tribe of Gypsies
Engineered and Recorded by Bill Cooper at American Recording Company, Calabasas, CA
and Roy Z at Mountain View Studios, Sylmar, CA
and Doom Room Studios, San Fernando, CA

Mixed by Richard Podolor and Bill Cooper at American Recording Company, Calabasas, CA
‘Flying Tigers, Crying Dragons’ and ’En El Mar’ mixed by Roy Z at Mountain View Studios, Sylmar, CA

Mastered by Andy Horn at Famous Kitchen, Adelsheim, Germany

Sources
TribeOfGypsies.com discography

2006 albums
Tribe of Gypsies albums
Victor Entertainment albums